Raspenava is a town in Liberec District in the Liberec Region of the Czech Republic. It has about 2,800 inhabitants.

Geography
It lies mostly in the Frýdlant Hills. The Smědá River flows through the town.

Two thirds of the territory are situated in the Jizerské hory Protected Landscape Area. Half of the Czech part of the UNESCO World Heritage Site named Ancient and Primeval Beech Forests of the Carpathians and Other Regions of Europe is situated in the southernmost part of the territory of Raspenava.

History
The first written mention of Raspenava is from 1343. The village was located on the left bank of the Smědá River, and there were several small hamlets on the right bank. Raspenava was originally an agricultural village, but its character began to change in the 16th century. In 1512, a hammer mill was built here, and later an ironworks and a lime factory were established.

In 1962, the settlements were merged into the town of Raspenava.

Notable people
Heinrich Karl Scholz (1880–1937), Austrian sculptor and medalist

Sights
The landmark of Raspenava is the Church of the Assumption of the Virgin Mary. It was built in 1906–1907.

Twin towns – sister cities

Raspenava is twinned with:
 Bischofswerda, Germany
 Gryfów Śląski, Poland

References

External links

Cities and towns in the Czech Republic
Populated places in Liberec District